Syria participated in the 2002 West Asian Games held in Kuwait, Kuwait from April 3 to April 12, 2002.

West Asian Games
Nations at the 2002 West Asian Games
Syria at the West Asian Games